Pierrette Adams (born 5 May 1962) is a singer, nicknamed "Mère Z", from the Republic of the Congo, who was based for many years in Abidjan in Côte d'Ivoire, and since 2003, has been based in Dakar in Senegal. She has released seven albums since 1994, plus a greatest hits disc in 2004.

Early life
Pierrette Adams was born on 5 May 1962, in Pointe-Noire, Republic of the Congo.

Before she worked professionally as a singer, Adams was an air hostess for the now defunct pan-African airline Air Afrique.

Career
Adams' career as a singer did not really succeed until she relocated to Abidjan, in Côte d'Ivoire. With the assistance of Boncana Maïga, of Africando, she was able to start her career as a singer and release her debut album Journal Intime in 1994.

In 2003, she moved to Dakar in Senegal, because her husband had to move there for work. Her 2003 album Anesthésie was well-received and she was nominated for the 2003 Kora All Africa Music Awards.

She had a "difficult childhood", and her songs cover topics including child abuse, injustice and infidelity.

Discography
 Journal Intime (1994)
  Mal de Mère (1996)
 Je Vous Salue Maris (1999)
 Absolument (2000)
 Anesthésie (2003)
 Best Of 10 Ans + Inédit "Nasuba" (2004)
 Coma Profond  (2007)
 7e Jour  (2012)

References

1962 births
Living people
Republic of the Congo musicians
African feminists
Republic of the Congo expatriates in Ivory Coast
Republic of the Congo expatriates in Senegal